Scholars Peak is a peak rising to   west of Mount Falconer, on the north wall of Taylor Valley in Victoria Land. The peak stands at the southwest end of Tarn Valley and was named by the New Zealand Geographic Board in 1998 in association with the prominent universities for which nearby tarns are named.

References

Mountains of Victoria Land